This is a list of Brazilian television related events from 1968.

Events

Debuts

Television shows

Births
1 March - Christine Fernandes, American-born actress
17 May - Mônica Martelli, actress & TV host

Deaths

See also
1968 in Brazil